Ajax is an extinct town in Stoddard County, in the U.S. state of Missouri.

Ajax was founded circa 1819, and named after Ajax, a character in Greek mythology.

References

Ghost towns in Missouri
Former populated places in Stoddard County, Missouri
1819 establishments in Missouri Territory